Anubandham may refer to:
 Anubandham (1984 film), a Telugu film
 Anubandham (1985 film), a Malayalam film